K. M. Daniel (9 May 1920 – 18 July 1988) was an Indian literary critic and scholar from Kerala, India.

Life
He was born in  Chengannur. He took his master's degree in Malayalam language from Kerala University  in literature and served for forty years as Lecturer and Professor in various colleges. He is the first person from University of Kerala to receive first rank in Malayalam M.A with a second class. 

He died on 18 July 1988 at the age of 68.

Works
Samgha Nadam
Vimarsanaveedhi
Kaladarsanam
Vedaviharapatanangal
Vimarsanam-Sidhanthavum Prayogavum
Veenapoovu Kanmnpil
Navachakravalam Naliniyilum Mattum

References

Malayali people
People from Alappuzha district
Malayalam literary critics
Academic staff of the University College Thiruvananthapuram
1920 births
1988 deaths
Writers from Kerala